The Delaware Mountains are a mountain range in the U.S. state of Texas, spanning part of Culberson County. The range extends south-southeast from Guadalupe Pass at the southern extent of the Guadalupe Mountains and Guadalupe Mountains National Park. The range is formed by horizontal layers of limestone, sandstone, and shale that were deposited 250 million years ago during the Permian that now encompass the Delaware Mountain Formation. The range is named for the Lenape, who are also known as the Delaware Indians. The Delaware Mountain Wind Energy Center is a 28.5 megawatt wind farm that was constructed on the northern portion of the range in 1999 and is operated by NextEra Energy Resources.

See also
Beach Mountains
Delaware Basin
Delaware River
El Capitan (Texas)
Guadalupe Peak
McKittrick Canyon
Trans-Pecos
Van Horn, Texas

References 

Mountain ranges of Texas
Landforms of Culberson County, Texas